Sarasgad fort is  situated near village Pali in the Raigad district of Maharashtra. Pali lies about 10 kilometres East of Nagothane along the Nagothane-Khopoli road. This fort height from sea level is 490 meters

How to reach
Sarasgad Fort is the twin of Sudhagad Fort. It can be identified by its four pinnacles and thus was mainly used as a watch place to check the surrounding region. The construction of the fort is now not in a good condition but the huge rock steps are something to be seen. On the way from the south, there are 111 steps carved in stone. The door from this side is known as 'Dindi darvaja'. There are two routes that lead to the top of this fort from Pali.

Places to see
On the top is the Shiva temple providing an excellent panoramic view of all the mountain ranges surrounding this area. Sudhagad, Sankshi fort, Sagargad and TailBaila can be easily viewed from the top of Sarasgad. There are many caves that were used for soldiers and other purposes because the fort has the very little area available on its top. There are around ten tanks carved in rocks. They provide cool water supply throughout the year, which is very important for any fort.

History
It was one of the forts which was captured by Malik Ahmad Nizam Shah I of Ahmednagar in his konkan campaigns in 1485. Shivaji Maharaj gave 2000 hones (golden coin used as currency during Shivaji Maharaj's time) for repairing the fortifications of this fort. After the victory over Vasai, Chimaji Appa donated a Portuguese bell to the Ballleshwar temple which he had brought from Vasai in 1739. Till independence, this fort was in Bhor princely state.

Nearby
Among the Ashtavinayakas, Ballaleshwar at Pali is the only Ganesha who is famous by the name of his devotee and who is dressed up as a Brahmin. This place is nestled between the fort Sarasgad and Amba River.

References

See also
 List of forts in Maharashtra
 List of forts in India
 Marathi People
 List of Maratha dynasties and states
 Maratha War of Independence
 Battles involving the Maratha Empire
 Maratha Army
 Maratha titles
 Military history of India
 List of people involved in the Maratha Empire

Buildings and structures of the Maratha Empire
Villages in Raigad district
Forts in Raigad district
16th-century forts in India
Caves of Maharashtra
Tourist attractions in Raigad district
Indian rock-cut architecture
Former populated places in India
Hiking trails in India